Stigmella krugeri is a moth of the family Nepticulidae. It was described by Vári in 1963. It is found in South Africa.

The larvae feed on Schotia brachypetala.

References

Endemic moths of South Africa
Nepticulidae
Moths of Africa
Moths described in 1963